Piotr Buchalski (born 4 March 1981) is a Polish rower. He competed in the men's eight event at the 2004 Summer Olympics.

References

1981 births
Living people
Polish male rowers
Olympic rowers of Poland
Rowers at the 2004 Summer Olympics
Sportspeople from Płock